Bluehost is a web hosting company owned by Endurance International Group. It was one of the 20 largest web hosts in 2015 and was collectively hosting over 2 million domains in 2010.

Bluehost was among those studied in the analysis of web-based hosting services in collaborative online learning programs.

Bluehost sells shared hosting, WordPress hosting, VPS hosting, dedicated hosting and WooCommerce hosting as well as professional marketing services. Their servers are powered by PHP 7, HTTP/2, and Nginx+ caching.

History
Matt Heaton first conceived Bluehost in 1996. However, he first created two other web hosts, 50megs.com and 0catch.com, before finally settling on Bluehost in 2003.

In 2009, Bluehost introduced a new feature called CPU throttling. CPU throttling (at Bluehost and similar hosting services) refers to the process of reducing user's CPU usage in whenever the particular user is pulling "too much" server resources at one time. At that particular time, Bluehost would freeze (or drastically reduce) client sites' CPU usage substantially. This effectively shut down clients' websites hosted on the Bluehost server for several hours throughout the day.

In 2010, Bluehost was acquired by Endurance International Group. In June 2011, company founder Matt Heaton announced on his blog that he was stepping down as CEO to focus on the company hosting platform's design and technical structure, while COO Dan Handy took over as CEO.

In 2013, Bluehost introduced VPS and dedicated server hosting.

In January 2015, Endurance International Group appointed Mike Olson as CEO of Bluehost, while Dan Handy moved to enterprise-wide mobile development for small businesses.

In January 2017, the company announced that it will lay off 440 Bluehost employees at Utah, in an effort to consolidate its business to improve customer support.

Controversies

In March 2009, Bluehost appeared in a Newsweek article that condemned the hosting company for censoring the web pages of some of their customers who were believed to be citizens of countries that the United States government had listed as rogue states.

In February 2011, Bluehost took down a religious website that they were hosting on its servers after receiving thousands of complaints when that website posted comments blaming gays and lesbians for an earthquake in New Zealand.

Security breach
In March 2015, Bluehost was hacked by Syrian Electronic Army. Also hacked were Justhost, Hostgator, Hostmonster and Fastdomain, all owned by Endurance International Group. SEA claimed that these services were hosting terrorist websites. Syrian Electronic Army posted screenshots of the attack on Twitter.

In January 2019, the magazine WebsitePlanet uncovered client-side vulnerability in some of the largest hosting companies in the world: Bluehost, DreamHost, HostGator, iPage and OVH.

References

External links
 

Web design companies of the United States
2003 establishments in Utah
Companies based in Provo, Utah
Companies based in Orem, Utah
Web hosting
Endurance International Group
WordPress